William Andrews was an African American laborer who was lynched by a white mob in Princess Anne, Maryland on June 9, 1897. Andrews, then 17, was tried, convicted, and hanged all in one day after being accused of assaulting Mrs. Benjamin T. Kelley.

Arrest and trial 

On the afternoon of May 5, 1897, Mrs. Benjamin T. Kelley claimed that local African American laborer William Andrews, aka "Cuba" assaulted her in Marion, Somerset County. Following these claims, Andrews was immediately arrested for the alleged attack on Kelley. He was moved to Baltimore City jail for protection from “lynch mobs” while awaiting trial. Around 11:00 a.m. on June 9, Andrews was brought to Main Street in Princess Anne, Somerset County where he was found guilty of the charges against him. Judge Henry Page sentenced Andrews to execution by hanging at the state's request.

Lynching 
Once the court adjourned, a large mob began to grow outside the courthouse making it impossible for the officers to transfer Andrews to the nearby Somerset County jail. While handcuffed, William Andrews was ripped away from the arms of the officers by an infuriated mob that cheered after hearing a guilty verdict. Andrews was brutally kicked, punched, and beaten with all sorts of weapons until the crowd of people were satisfied. After the crowd realized Andrew Williams was still alive they dragged his body to the property of Z. James Doughtery, where he was hanged on a walnut tree until he was finally pronounced dead. His body remained on the walnut tree until around 2:30 p.m. on June 9, 1897.

See also 

 Mass racial violence in the United States
 Lynching of Matthew Williams

References 

 
 

Wikipedia Student Program
Andrews, William
1897 deaths
American murder victims
Murdered African-American people
Somerset County, Maryland
People murdered in Maryland
1897 murders in the United States
Male murder victims
Racially motivated violence against African Americans
1897 in Maryland